Brooklyn Community Board 14 is a New York City community board that encompasses the Brooklyn neighborhoods of Flatbush, Midwood, Kensington, and Ocean Parkway. It is delimited by Coney Island Avenue, the Long Island Rail Road, McDonald Avenue, Avenue F and 18th Avenue on the west, Parkside Avenue on the north, Bedford Avenue, Foster Avenue and Nostrand Avenue on the east, and Kings Highway and Avenue P on the south.

Its current chairman is Ed Powell, and its district manager is Shawn Campbell. 

As of the United States Census, 2000, the Community Board has a population of 168,806, up from 159,825 in 1990 and 143,859 in 1980. Of them (as of 2000), 60,268 (35.7%) are White non Hispanic, 66,211 (39.2%) are African-American, 13,155 (7.8%) Asian or Pacific Islander, 268 (0.2%) American Indian or Native Alaskan, 893 (0.5%) of some other race, 5,769 (3.4%) of two or more race, 22,242 (13.2%) of Hispanic origins. 36.8% of the population benefit from public assistance as of 2004, up from 21.6% in 2000.

References

External links
Brooklyn Community Board 14 Official Website 
Profile of the Community Board (PDF)
Brooklyn neighborhood map
Brooklyn Community Board 14's Annual Youth Conference 

Community boards of Brooklyn
Flatbush, Brooklyn
Midwood, Brooklyn